Arland W. Johnson (July 12, 1896 – December 25, 1968) was an American architect. His work included theaters such as Proctor's Theatre (Troy, New York).

Johnson lived in Toledo, Ohio and had offices there and in New York City.

Works
 Palladium Theatre (Worcester, Massachusetts) at 261 Main Street (still in use) 
Garde Arts Center at 325 State Street in New London, Connecticut (still in use) 
Eagles Theatre at 106 W. Market Street in Wabash, Indiana (still in use) 
 Proctor's Theatre (Troy, New York) at 82 Fourth Street
 Proctor's Theatre (Mount Vernon, New York) at 6 Gramatan Avenue 
Broadway Theatre (Detroit, Michigan) at 1337 Broadway
Columbia Theater (Sharon, Pennsylvania) at 82 W. State Street
Commodore Hull Theatre at 65-67 Elizabeth Street in Derby, Connecticut Some of the building's features remain although it has been converted into a parking garage.
Jefferson Theater (Auburn, New York) at 61 State Street
 Palace Performing Arts Center at 246 College Street in New Haven, Connecticut   
Washington Theatre (Detroit, Michigan) at 1505-1513 Washington Boulevard

References

Architects from Toledo, Ohio
Architects from New York City
American theatre architects
1896 births
1968 deaths